Attraction is a 2017 Russian science fiction action film directed by Fyodor Bondarchuk. The plot focuses upon an extraterrestrial spaceship crash-landing in the Chertanovo district of Moscow. The Russian government immediately implements martial law, as local civilians grow increasingly angry at their unwelcome guest. The film stars Irina Starshenbaum, Alexander Petrov, Rinal Mukhametov, and Oleg Menshikov.

According to Bondarchuk, the movie is a social allegory. The script writers stated that it was inspired by the 2013 Biryulyovo riots.

The project became the fourth Russian film transferred to the IMAX 3D format. The premiere of the film in Russia was on 26 January 2017 by Walt Disney Studios Sony Pictures Releasing (WDSSPR). Attraction became a box office hit, grossing more than 1 billion rubles and becoming the highest-grossing Russian sci-fi movie. It was also a pretty good critical success with the Russian media. The film received mixed reviews from western critics.

A sequel, Invasion, premiered on New Year's Day 2020.

Plot
The storyline revolves around Colonel Valentin Lebedev, who is in charge of the military operation, his daughter Yulia, who develops a romantic relationship with the alien Hekon, and her former boyfriend Artyom who is the main antagonist.

Hekon is a representative of a technologically-advanced extraterrestrial race who travels to Earth incognito for research purposes. While traveling through the Solar System, his spaceship is damaged by a meteor shower. The Russian Air Force mistakes his spaceship for a NATO military spacecraft and damages it by firing missiles into it, causing it to crash into several buildings in Moscow and kill hundreds of people. It is on that same day when Yulia and Artyom have finished attending a meteor-watching event, that Yulia's friend Svetlana is killed while watching some meteors.

The Russian government decides not to enter into contact with the ship and let it fix itself on its own. The area around the landing site is evacuated and cordoned off; Moscow is then placed under a curfew. Meanwhile, Yulia, Artyom, and his friends Khariton, Ruslan, and Piton sneak into the crash site to investigate the alien: after they beat him up and cause him to crash down a building, they retrieve his armor before an army patrol may find them. On another day, Yulia sneaks again to retrieve the alien, placing him with a nerdy classmate known as "Google" to help the alien recover. While examining his body, she notices a wristband forming on her right wrist, which manipulates water.

The alien, who introduces himself as "Hekon", was initially unsure about Earth and its people, but tells them that he is looking for a device known as "Shilk", that allows him to travel through space without destroying his body. Shilk, like the spaceship, appears to be attracting water. As he goes out to the streets to look for the device, the police mistake him for a drug addict and send him off to a police station to be interrogated.

Meanwhile, Artyom and his friends drive in their car to inform Colonel Lebedev about the alien's armor that they had hidden in their garage. They stumble upon a crowd who are angry over rationed water, as the spaceship appears to absorb water in order to repair itself. Ruslan decides to provoke the crowd into becoming a disorderly riot. Artyom is hit by a policeman's baton as he tries to convince people to stop rioting, and is taken to the police station but he forgets to tell Colonel Lebedev about his discovery.

In order to get Shilk, Yulia goes to see her father, who interrupts his meeting with his officers when she informed him that she is pregnant with Hekon's child. She actually says this to distract him, so Hekon can disguise himself as a scientist and take Shilk from its container, and also because she was upset that he did not spend much time with her after her mother died.

Yulia confesses her true feelings for Hekon in a phone call to Artyom, while Artyom arrives with his friends to beat up the alien. Hekon fights back, and when one of Artyom's friends tries to shoot Hekon, Ruslan is shot by accident instead. Artyom and one of his friends flee before the police would arrest them. He reports this incident to gather many supporters and form a group to attack Hekon's spaceship, and avenge Ruslan's death, for which he blames the alien. In spite of his initial support, Piton sometimes expresses doubt on Artyom's goals.

Artyom's group breaks through a police barricade, triggering several other robotic suits to come out and fight against the mob. Yulia and Hekon drive through the police barricade and the mob using an armored car to return him and Shilk back to their ship, while fending off against Artyom, who angrily rampages using Hekon's suit. Hekon defeats Artyom, but Artyom shoots him and Yulia with an AK-74. Saddened by this, Colonel Lebedev follows several walking suits as they carry Yulia and Hekon to the spaceship, where its machinery uses water to nurse Yulia's injuries. The spaceship's computer also responds to Lebedev's questions about Hekon's mission to observe the Earth, as its warlike civilizations and history had made it very unsafe for interstellar contact. However, Yulia's love for Hekon, and her willingness to protect him, have caused the computer's authorities to rewrite the results of their study on Earth.

Yulia, her father, and everyone else return to their daily lives, as the spaceship departs and releases excess water. Meanwhile, Artyom is arrested and presumably sent to a prison camp.

The moral of the movie is vocalized by Yulia at the end: The truth is that one alien from far away trusted us more than we trust ourselves.

Cast

Production

Casting
During the filming, the actor Alexander Petrov cut open his leg with glass and damaged his tendons, after which he was forced to remove his cast and use an understudy. In addition, Fyodor Bondarchuk expressed dissatisfaction with the fact that the close relations between the main characters in the roles of actress Irina Starshenbaum and actor Alexander Petrov create difficulties in the production of the film.

Filming
Principal photography began in November 2015.
The shooting took place in strict secrecy in different regions of Moscow, mainly in Chertanovo, and at the facilities of the Ministry of Defense with the participation of the latest military equipment of the Russian Armed Forces. The shooting involved armored personnel carriers, helicopters, Uranus-6 robots, drones, armored vehicles GAZ Tigr, Typhoon (AFV family) and the Russian aircraft carrier Admiral Kuznetsov.

Post-production 
The visual effects involved 255 artists of the Russian company Main Road Post, which until that time worked on the films Metro (2013 film), August Eighth (2012 film), Wanted (2008 film), Stalingrad (2013 film) and The Duelist (2016 film). It took about a year and a half to work with effects. The most difficult effects are considered the moment of the fall of the spacecraft.

Soundtrack
The music for the picture was written by composer Ivan Burlyaev.

The soundtrack includes 34 tracks. To record the soundtrack, the latest musical workstation (synthesizer) Yamaha Montage 8 was used at that time, which, according to the composer, was not sold anywhere else.

On January 26, the soundtrack for the film was released on Yandex Music, and on January 27 in iTunes.

Release
Attraction was released in Russia, Armenia, Belarus and Kazakhstan on 26 January 2017 and Vietnam on 27 January 2017.

Reception
The budget of the film was 380 million rubles, or, according to other sources, 520 million rubles including film marketing.

Box office
Attraction was a commercial success. It grossed 44 million RUB on its opening day, and held on the top of Russian box office for several weeks. By the end of its theatrical run, Attraction grossed more than 1 billion RUB, approximately three times the movie's budget.

Critical response
Attraction received significant positive reviews in Russian media, including Afisha, Kommersant, Mir Fantastiki, KG-portal, and The Hollywood Reporter. According to review aggregator Kritikanstvo.ru, out of 58 reviews, 10 were negative (among them, a very harsh review from the popular video blogger BadComedian), and the average rating of the movie was 6.4 out of 10. Attraction was praised for its social commentary, visuals and acting (Oleg Menshikov's performance in particular), but some reviews criticized the movie's negative portrayal of Russian youth and certain inconsistencies in characterization.

Attraction has an approval rating of 36% on review aggregator website Rotten Tomatoes, based on 11 reviews, and an average rating of 4.90/10.

Sequel
According to co-producer Aleksandr Andryushchenko, in case of commercial success, the continuation of the film will be shot. According to the director Fyodor Bondarchuk, the script for the continuation has already been written.

Filming of the movie Invasion began in July 2018; the tape was released on January 1, 2020.

References

External links 
 Official website at the Art Pictures Studio 
 
 
 

2017 films
2010s Russian-language films
Films directed by Fedor Bondarchuk
2017 science fiction action films
2010s science fiction thriller films
Fiction about meteoroids
Russian science fiction action films
Russian science fiction  thriller films
2017 3D films
Russian 3D films
IMAX films
2010s dystopian films
Films about extraterrestrial life
Films set in Moscow
Films set in Russia
Films shot in Moscow
Columbia Pictures films
Films produced by Fyodor Bondarchuk